Zarechnoye is a rural locality (a selo) and the administrative center of Kopninskoye Rural Settlement, Sobinsky District, Vladimir Oblast, Russia. The population was 1,165 as of 2010. There are 5 streets.

Geography 
Zarechnoye is located 17 km southwest of Sobinka (the district's administrative centre) by road. Mitrofanka is the nearest rural locality.

References 

Rural localities in Sobinsky District